30 Days of Night: Rumors of the Undead is the first novel spinoff of the 30 Days of Night comic series. It is co-written by Steve Niles (who wrote the comic) and Jeff Mariotte.

Rumors of the Undead is set after the events of the comic Dark Days. It centers on FBI agents Andy Gray investigating the circumstances that led his partner Paul Norris to turn into a vampire, an investigation that leads him back to Barrow, Alaska, where it all began. 

2006 American novels
30 Days of Night novels
Novels set in Alaska
Works by Steve Niles
Novels by Jeff Mariotte
IDW Publishing adaptations